Mathieu Justafre (born 24 March 1980) is a French snowboarder. He competed in the men's halfpipe event at the 2002 Winter Olympics.

References

1980 births
Living people
French male snowboarders
Olympic snowboarders of France
Snowboarders at the 2002 Winter Olympics
Sportspeople from Perpignan
21st-century French people